Ethmia randycurtisi is a moth in the family Depressariidae.

The ground color of the forewings is whitish with a series of elongated dark markings. The hindwing ground colour is whitish, but pale brown towards the margin.

Etymology
The species is named in honor of Randy Curtis for his continuous encouragement, financial support and advice on behalf of Instituto Nacional de Biodiversidad's beginning in Santo Domingo de Heredia.

References

Moths described in 2014
randycurtisi